Aquabirnavirus is a genus of viruses, in the family Birnaviridae. Salmonid fish serve as natural hosts. There are three species in this genus. A disease associated with this genus, Infectious pancreatic necrosis (IPN) in salmonid fish, causes significant losses to the aquaculture industry. Chronic infection in adults, and acute viral disease in young salmonid fish can occur.

Taxonomy
The genus contains the following species:
 Infectious pancreatic necrosis virus
 Tellina virus
 Yellowtail ascites virus

Structure
Viruses in Aquabirnavirus are non-enveloped, with icosahedral and single-shelled geometries, and T=13 symmetry. The diameter is around 70 nm. Genomes are linear and segmented, around 2.7-3kb in length. The genome codes for 5 proteins.

Life cycle
Viral replication is cytoplasmic. Entry into the host cell is achieved by penetration into the host cell. Replication follows the double-stranded RNA virus replication model. Double-stranded RNA virus transcription is the method of transcription. Salmonid fish serve as the natural host. Transmission routes are contact.

References

External links
 ICTV Report: Birnaviridae
 Viralzone: Aquabirnavirus

Birnaviridae
Double-stranded RNA viruses
Virus genera